Andrzej Bek (born 26 June 1951) is a former Polish cyclist. He won the Olympic bronze medal in the Tandem in the 1972 Summer Olympics in Munich along with Benedykt Kocot.

References 

1951 births
Living people
Polish male cyclists
Olympic cyclists of Poland
Cyclists at the 1972 Summer Olympics
Olympic bronze medalists for Poland
Olympic medalists in cycling
Sportspeople from Łódź
Medalists at the 1972 Summer Olympics